The Laysan noctuid moth (Agrotis laysanensis) is a species of moth in the family Noctuidae.

It is endemic to Laysan, in the Northwestern Hawaiian Islands.

This moth was one, if not the main species, eaten by the extinct Laysan millerbird. Agrotis moths are commonly known as "millers", and the bird was named after its favorite food.

References

Lepidoptera of the Outlying Hawaiian Islands
Atoll Research Bulletin - Specimens collected on Laysan Island

laysanensis
Endemic moths of Hawaii
Natural history of the Northwestern Hawaiian Islands
Taxonomy articles created by Polbot